Magnoptera is a genus of moths in the subfamily Arctiinae. It contains the single species Magnoptera watsoni, which is found in Chile.

References

Natural History Museum Lepidoptera generic names catalog

Arctiinae
Endemic fauna of Chile